MasterChef is the Brazilian version of the competitive cooking reality show MasterChef airing on Band. The series premiered on September 2, 2014.

Amateur chefs compete to become the best amateur home cook in Brazil through challenges issued by judges Érick Jacquin, Paola Carosella and Henrique Fogaça. Ana Paula Padrão is the main host.

Earlier in 2021, Paola Carosella announced that she would be departing from the show. Her spot will be filled by Helena Rizzo in the next edition of the competition.

Format
Chefs were initially selected through auditions, selecting a total of one hundred competitors to the start of the televised competition. In the preliminary rounds, each of these had an opportunity to prepare a signature dish for the trio of judges.

The contestants were given a limited amount of time to prep their dish, and then given five minutes before the three judges to complete the cooking and assembly of the dish, during which the judges ask about their background.

The 3 judges taste the dish, and vote "yes" or "no" to keeping the chef in the competition; 2 "yes" votes are required for the chef to move on and receive a MasterChef apron, while those that fail to do so leave the competition.

On the first three seasons, two rounds were then used to trim the number of chefs to 16–21. One type of challenge has the chefs performing a routine task such as dicing onions, during which the judges will observe their technique.

Judges can advance a chef to the next round or eliminate them at any time during the challenge by taking their apron. A second type of challenge is to have the chefs invent a new dish around a staple ingredient or a theme, with the judges advancing or eliminating players based on the taste of their dishes.

Subsequently, the formal competition begins typically following a 2-event cycle that takes place over a 2-hour episode, with a chef eliminated after the second event. The events typically are: Mystery Box Challenge, Elimination Test, Team Challenge and Pressure Test.

This cycle continues until only two chefs remain. The judges then select the winner of MasterChef.

Series overview

Season chronology

Ratings and reception

Spin-offs

MasterChef Junior
MasterChef Junior is a series featuring children from ages 9 to 13 as contestants, aiming to find the best junior chef in Brazil. The series premiered on October 20, 2015.

MasterChef Profissionais
MasterChef Profissionais is series featuring professional chefs as contestants, aiming to find the best professional chef in Brazil. The series premiered on October 4, 2016.

MasterChef: A Revanche
MasterChef: A Revanche is series featured returning former contestants from the first six series, who did not win the competition before, as contestants, aiming to find the best all-star chef from MasterChef. The series premiered on October 15, 2019.

MasterChef +
MasterChef + is a series featuring seniors over 60 years old as contestants, aiming to find the best senior chef in Brazil. The series premiered on November 15, 2022.

MasterChef: Para Tudo
MasterChef: Para Tudo is a TV show featuring interviews with judges and former contestants, plus recipes and memes, presented by Ana Paula Padrão. The series premiered on March 26, 2019.

The program name referenced the recurring expression "stop everything!"  said to the competitors by the presenter Ana Paula Padrão in the competition versions of the franchise.

The format of this version did not consist of a game between chefs, but of interviews, reports, recipes, best moments and viral content about the franchise.

All material used in the program was exclusive, including interviews with the eliminated, family members and guests about the competition's developments.  The program also brought public participation on social media, interacting with the presenter.

Awards and nominations

References

External links
 MasterChef on Band.com
 

 
2014 Brazilian television series debuts
Portuguese-language television shows
Brazilian television series based on British television series
Brazilian reality television series
Television shows filmed in São Paulo (state)
Brazilian cooking television series
Rede Bandeirantes original programming